Events from the 1320s in Denmark.

Incumbents 
 Monarch – Christopher II of Denmark (until 1326),Valdemar III of Denmark

Events 
 1320
  25 January  Christopher II of Denmark signs a håndfæstning and is elected as King of Denmark in Viborg.

 1321
 Eric Christoffersen of Denmark is elected king alongside his father.
 21 January  Kolding's oldest known market town rights.

1324
 15 August  Coronation of Christopher II and his son Eric Christoffersen.

1325
 An alliance between Danish magnates and Gerhard III,  Count of Holstein-Rendsburg and John I, Count of Holstein-Kiel, son of Adolf IV of Holstein) start a rebellion.
 Eric Christoffersen of Denmark is taken prisoner and confined in Haderslev Castle.
 Christopher II of Denmark is forced to abdicate and go into exile,
 The 12-year-old Duke Valdemar of Southern Jutland was made king of Denmark under the regent, Count Gerhard III of Holstein.

1326
 February  The new Knardrup Abbey is settled by monks from Sorø Abbey.
 Date unknown  Skive is incorporated as a market town.
 Date unknown  Vejle is incorporated as a market town.

Births 
 c. 1320 Valdemar IV of Denmark (died 1375)
 c. 1320 Helvig of Schleswig (died c. 1374)

Deaths 
 12 March 1325 – Eric II, Duke of Schleswig (born c. 1290)

References 

Denmark